"Tera Woh Pyar" is a Pakistani Urdu song by Shuja Haider. Originally released in 2004 as a single, the song gained newfound popularity in 2016 when it was performed on Coke Studio.

2016 version 

In 2016, Asim Azhar and Momina Mustehsan performed a medley of two of Haider's singles, "Tera Woh Pyar" and "Nawazishein Karam", during the ninth season of Coke Studio. Haider served as the music director and keyboardist for the Coke Studio version, with additional lyrics provided by Naqash Hyder. This version was released on 16 September 2016.

Popularity 
The Coke Studio version of the song is broadly popular in Pakistan and India. The song surpassed 100 million YouTube views in September 2018, making it the third Coke Studio performance to cross 100 million views after Atif Aslam's performance of "Tajdar-e-Haram" and Rahat Fateh Ali Khan and Mustehsan's performance of "Afreen Afreen". Additionally, the video made Azhar the fourth Pakistani artist to reach 100 million views on YouTube. As of 10 February 2022, the song has gained 151 million views.

Reception 
Azhar has said that he found the public reception to the track to be unexpected and is grateful for it. Bollywood actor Nawazuddin Siddiqui has praised the track, stating in an interview that he listened to the song while filming Manto to mentally prepare himself for each day of shooting.

Song credits 

 Singers: Asim Azhar and Momina Mustehsan
 Music Director: Shuja Haider
 Lyrics By: Naqash Hyder
 Produced and Directed By: Strings
 Houseband: Imran Akhoond (Guitars), Aahad Nayani (Drums), Babar Khanna (Dholak/Tabla), Kamran 'Mannu' Zafar (Bass), Haider Ali (Keyboards/Piano), Kashan Admani (Guitar), Abdul Aziz Kazi (Percussions)
 Guest Musicians: Ustad Tanweer Hussain (Mandolin), Sajid Ali (Flute), Shehroze Hussain (Sitar)
 String Section: Javed Iqbal (Head), Ghulam Abbas, Nadeem Ahmed, M Ilyas, Sakawat Ali, Ghulam Mohammad
 Backing Vocalists: Rachel Viccaji, Shahab Hussain, Nimra Rafiq

See also 
 List of most-viewed Pakistani music videos on YouTube
 Tajdar-e-Haram
 Afreen Afreen

References 

2016 songs
Pakistani songs
Coke Studio (Pakistani TV program)
Urdu-language songs
Asim Azhar songs